Kosovo was part of the Ottoman Empire from 1455 to 1912, at first as part of the eyalet of Rumelia, and from 1864 as a separate Kosovo Vilayet.

During this period several administrative districts (known as sanjaks ("banners" or districts) each ruled by a sanjakbey (roughly equivalent to "district lord") have included parts of the territory as parts of their territories.

History

17th century
During the Great Turkish War (1683–99), in October 1689, a small Habsburg force under Margrave Ludwig of Baden breached the Ottoman Empire and reached as far as Kosovo, following their earlier capture of Belgrade. Many Serbs and Albanians pledged their loyalty to the Austrians, some joining Ludwig's army. A massive Ottoman counter-attack the following summer drove the Austrians back to their fortress at Niš, then back to Belgrade, then finally back across the Danube into Austria.

The Ottoman offensive was accompanied by savage reprisals and looting, prompting many Serbs – including Arsenije III, Patriarch of the Serbian Orthodox Church – to flee along with the Austrians. This event has been immortalised in Serbian history as the Great Migrations of the Serbs, regarded an alleged huge exodus of hundreds of thousands of Serbs from Kosovo and Serbia proper.

19th century

During and after the Serbian–Ottoman War of 1876–78, between 30,000 and 70,000 Muslims, mostly Albanians, were expelled by the Serb army from the Sanjak of Niš and fled to the Kosovo Vilayet.

In 1878, the League of Prizren was created by Albanians from four vilayets including the Vilayet of Kosovo. The League's purpose was to attain albanian autonomy within the Ottoman empire for and incursions by the newly emerging Balkan nations.

By 1878 Kosovo (in whole or in part) had become the subject of Albanian, Serbian and Montenegrin irredentism (all alongside other regions relevant to each nation). Kosovo's population from these three groups had begun taking steps to fill the power vacuum created by then-weakening Ottoman central authority in the region.

1900–18
In 1910, an Albanian-organised insurrection broke out in Pristina and soon spread to the entire vilayet of Kosovo, lasting for three months. The Ottoman sultan Mehmed V visited Kosovo in June 1911 during peace settlement talks covering all Albanian-inhabited areas.

Islamisation
Despite the imposition of Muslim rule, large numbers of Christians continued to live and sometimes even prosper under the Ottomans. A process of Islamisation began shortly after the beginning of Ottoman rule but it took a considerable amount of time – at least a century – and was concentrated at first on the towns. It appears that many Christian Albanian inhabitants converted directly to Islam, rather than being replaced by Muslims from outside Kosovo. A large part of the reason for the conversion was probably economic and social, as Muslims had considerably more rights and privileges than Christian subjects. Christian religious life nonetheless continued, with churches largely left alone by the Ottomans, but both the Serbian Orthodox and Roman Catholic churches and their congregations suffered from high levels of taxation. The Ottomans appeared to have a more deliberate approach to converting the Roman Catholic population of whom were mostly Albanians as compared to adherents of Eastern Orthodoxy who were mostly Serbs, as they viewed the former less favorably due to its allegiance to Rome, a competing regional power.

Demographics

Around the 17th century, there is evidence of an increasingly visible Albanian population initially concentrated in Metohia. It has been claimed this was the result of migrations out of the south-west (i.e. modern Albania), and that the putative migrants brought Islam with them. There is certainly evidence of migration: many Kosovo Albanians have surnames characteristic of inhabitants of the northern Albanian region of Malësi. However, many others do not. A small number of Slavs – presumably members of the Serbian Orthodox Church – converted to Islam under Ottoman rule. Today, most Slavic Muslims of Serbia live in the Sandžak region of southern Serbia, northwest of Kosovo. Some historians believe that there was probably a pre-existing population of Catholic Albanians in Metohia who mostly converted to Islam, but remained strictly a minority in a still largely Serb-inhabited region.  According to Austrian data, by the 1890s Kosovo was 70% Muslim (nearly entirely of Albanian descent) and less than 30% non-Muslim (primarily Serbs).

Demographic maps

See also

Rumelia
Kosovo Vilayet

References